The arteriovenous oxygen difference, or a-vO2 diff, is the difference in the oxygen content of the blood between the arterial blood and the venous blood. It is an indication of how much oxygen is removed from the blood in capillaries as the blood circulates in the body. The a-vO2 diff and cardiac output are the main factors that allow variation in the body's total oxygen consumption, and are important in measuring VO2. The a-vO2 diff is usually measured in millilitres of oxygen per 100 millilitres of blood (mL/100 mL).

Measurement
The arteriovenous oxygen difference is usually taken by comparing the difference in the oxygen concentration of oxygenated blood in the femoral, brachial, or radial artery and the oxygen concentration in the deoxygenated blood from the mixed supply found in the pulmonary artery (as an indicator of the typical mixed venous supply).

Put in simple terms:
a-vO2 diff = Ca – Cv
where:
Ca = the oxygen concentration of arterial blood (oxygenated blood)
Cv = the oxygen concentration of venous blood (deoxygenated blood)

The usual unit for a-vO2 diff is millilitres of oxygen per 100 millilitres of blood (mL/100 mL), however, particularly in medical uses, other units may be used, such as micro moles per millilitre (μmol/mL).

In practice, a-vO2 diff may be determined using the Fick Principle rather than by taking direct blood samples. In order to do so oxygen consumption (VO2) may be measured using a spirometer to detect gaseous concentrations in exhaled air compared to inhaled air, while cardiac output can be determined using a Doppler ultrasound.

Arterial blood will generally contain an oxygen concentration of around 20 mL/100 mL. Venous blood with an oxygen concentration of 15 mL/100 mL would therefore lead to typical values of the a-vO2 diff at rest of around 5 mL/100 mL. During intense exercise, however, the a-vO2 diff can increase to as much as 16 mL/100 mL due to the working muscles extracting far more oxygen from the blood than they do at rest.

Alternatively, in order to find the efficiency of the lungs in replenishing blood oxygen levels, the a-vO2 diff may instead be taken by comparing blood from the pulmonary artery and the pulmonary vein; in this case a negative value for a-vO2 diff would be obtained as the oxygen content of the blood would have increased.

Impacts of exercise
Physical exercise leads to an increase in the arteriovenous oxygen difference in all individuals. As exercise intensities increase, the muscles increase the amount of oxygen they extract from the blood, and this therefore results in further increases in a-vO2 diff.

The maximum a-vO2 diff is also usually greater in trained athletes than in untrained individuals. This is a result of aerobic exercise leading to hypertrophy of the slow twitch muscle fibres mainly due to increased capillarisation. The increase in capillary beds in the muscle means that blood supply to that muscle can be greater and diffusion of oxygen, carbon dioxide, and other metabolites increases. With training the muscles also improve in their ability to extract oxygen from the blood and process the oxygen, possibly due to adaptations of the mitochondria and an increase in the muscle's myoglobin content.

Research has shown that following the commencement of exercise there is a delay in the increase of the a-vO2 diff, and that a-vO2 diff only has a marginal impact in the total change in VO2 in the early stages of exercise. The bulk of the early increase in oxygen consumption after a sudden change in exercise levels results from increased cardiac output. However it has also been found that the increase in the maximal a-vO2 diff resulting from adaptations to a physical training program can account for most of the difference in VO2 max in subjects participating in sub-maximal exercise.

In medicine
Arteriovenous oxygen difference is also used in other areas of study such as medicine and medical research. For example, the a-vO2 diff has been used to measure cerebral blood flow in comatose patients, assisting with their diagnosis and treatment. The a-vO2 diff has also been used to determine the effects of physical training in coronary patients.

See also
 Blood gas
 Oxygen saturation

References

Sources
 

Cardiology
Exercise physiology
Sports terminology